Qila Sattar Shah (Urdu: قلعہ ستار شاہ) is a town located in the Ferozewala Tehsil of Sheikhupura District, Punjab, Pakistan.

It is served by Qila Sattar Shah railway station.

References

Villages in Pakistan
Villages in Sheikhupura District